Philippine Rabbit Bus Lines, Inc. (PRBL) is a provincial bus company in the Philippines. It was founded in 1946 and is one of the oldest bus companies in the country. The company's area of coverage extends from Metro Manila to Baguio and northern provinces of Pampanga and Tarlac. Its main terminal in Metro Manila is along Avenida in Santa Cruz, Manila.

Philippine Rabbit was once known for their red, rivet-studded buses powered by Isuzu, with the illuminated sign at the front, which once became a staple of roads in Northern Luzon. They were eventually supplanted by more modern Nissan Diesel units.

Etymology
Mr. Ricardo L. Paras, the company's general manager, explains that the company was named Philippine Rabbit in reference to the actual animal because of its speed and agility, not to mention how fast they pro-create. Secondly, the first acquisition of buses by the company then showed that the main body feature of the bus was shaped like the Rabbit. The company was known then as Philippine Rabbit Bus Company in 1948 until it was incorporated in August 1957 as the Philippine Rabbit Bus Lines Incorporated or simply PRBL.

History
Philippine Rabbit was founded on August 28, 1946 by brothers-in-law, Florencio P. Buan and Ricardo L. Paras. It was then named Philippine Rabbit Bus Company, Ltd. They started with two salvaged US Army weapon carriers which they bought in a junk shop in Mabalacat, Pampanga. Their maiden trip was from Divisoria, Manila with a stopover in San Fernando, Pampanga. On its one year of operation, the company was operating ten US Army weapon carriers converted to passenger trucks. In 1952, they acquired front-engined International Harvester buses which operated from Manila to Moncada, Camiling, Victoria, La Paz, Concepcion and Tarlac City. The company was incorporated on August 28, 1957 with the business name Philippine Rabbit Bus Lines, Incorporated.

Philippine Rabbit was continuously expanding in growth and operation in the 1960s. It has acquired interest in distributing the Mitsubishi Fuso brand of motor vehicle engines and spare parts in the country. On March 25, 1963, the PRBL incorporators organized the Bupar Motors Corporation as the exclusive distributor of Mitsubishi Fuso engines and spare parts in the country. The corporation also included a bus body building plant (which built their famous red, rivet-studded buses) and a tire recapping facility.

Philippine Rabbit was the first to introduce First Class bus accommodations in Western Luzon with the two-seater MAN White Rabbits, and the more innovative Philippine Rabbit Mini-Bus for short distance or local passengers. These PRBL Mini-buses were called the PRBL Mosquito Fleet.

In 1977 PRBL opened its Rabbitours Division in its Caloocan Terminal on 2nd Avenue to handle chartered trips for domestic tours. With the tax incentives the government gives to Tourism oriented companies, PRBL started acquiring air-conditioned buses. In the start of the 1980s, the Company started modernizing its bus fleet with air-conditioned buses servicing the routes to Baguio, Balanga, Bataan, Laoag, Ilocos Norte, and Tarlac.

In January 1992, PRBL started its bus fleet rehabilitation. They announced the acquisition of 150 brand new air conditioned buses for its 3-year modernization program to meet the demands for safe and convenient travel on air conditioned buses. Twenty Mitsubishi De Luxe (2001 series) were commissioned in 1992; another thirty Nissan Diesel (Aero Bus Series) in 1993; Fifty Nissan Diesel (Flexi Series) in 1994, and another fifty Nissan Diesel (Euro Bus Series 3015) in 1995.

In 1998, the Philippine Rabbit became one of the sponsors of the Metropolitan Basketball Association in partnership with the ABS-CBN Corporation. The company renewed its partnership with ABS-CBN in February 2000.

Labor dispute and losses
In 2002, the company's workers conducted a 50 day strike. By November 2002, the company was forced to close its offices due to the strike. The strike ended on 19 December 2002 after the company's workers and management came to an agreement.

On April 5, 2004, the company's employees went on strike and demanded for the prompt payment of salaries and benefits, their 13th Month Pay, Retirement benefits, and service incentive pays, including the immediate updating of employees' SSS premium contributions and collected SSS Salary loan deductions. They also cite the non-implementation of agreement between the workers and the Philippine Rabbit dated December 2002. On April 7, 2004, DOLE Secretary Patricia Sto. Tomas issued a Return-to-Work Order with PRBL Management promising to settle its obligations to the employees. The Company defaulted.

In order to regain losses after the strike, the company had to sell many of its assets, including bus units, franchises, and real properties. Its area of coverage was narrowed, since the company had to give up in favor of other players some of its routes.

Today
The company resumed full operations in 2005 fielding its legacy platforms, the NDPC Euro and the newly refurbished 8500s DMMC units, together with a handful of surviving ordinary units. However its trips were limited as manifested by the closure and the sale of its Balintawak terminal which catered to most of its trips to Northern Luzon leaving only its Avenida Rizal terminal as its only terminal in Metro Manila.

It is also during this period that the management tried to supplant its aging fleet by acquiring surplus Korean buses.

The company faced another challenge when the Land Transportation Franchising and Regulatory Board in 2014, mandated that all PUBs that are 15 years of age shall be phased out imposing heavy penalties for violations. This decision severely affected PRBL's operations since the bulk of its fleet were acquired from 1994–1998. This forced the management to phased out its old units and stop its trips to Baguio, Abra, and Alaminos. Trips to Alaminos is later resumed in 2015.

The company started replacing its aging fleet with brand new units which started to arrive in 2014h the arrival of 5 new Sunlong Bus units and followed by several others.

In March 2015, Philippine Rabbit acquired ten (10) KLQ6109 V90 units from Higer Bus Co. Ltd. Several months after, they acquired additional ten (10) units from Higer, a longer version than the first one, KLQ6119 V91.

In March 2016, they acquired seven (7) GDW6119H2 units from Guilin Daewoo Bus Co. Ltd. through Autodelta as the main distributor of Guilin Buses in the Philippines. Additional GDW6119H2 units should be acquired later but the company discontinued the acquisition for unknown reason.

On October 21, 2016, PRBL acquired 4 new buses from Santarosa Motorworks (1101-1107), Daewoo BV115. This acquisition from SANTAROSA MOTORWORKS is the first for PRBL after more than a decade.

Another batch of HIGER BUS (fleet numbers; 1109-1133) composed of twelve (12) were delivered at PRBL early in December 2016. These buses bore superficial resemblance to the 2nd batch of Higer (V91 series) but are powered by more powerful engines (Yuchai YCGL310-30). They are intended to ply Manila-Baguio route alongside the Daewoo BV115 they acquired earlier.

On May 24, 2017, Philippine Rabbit resumed full operations from Manila to Baguio using its latest fleet of buses (1100 series) composed of Santarosa BV115 and Higer V91 bus units.

On June 10, 2017 another batch of five (5) brand new Daewoo BV115 buses from Santarosa Motoworks, Inc., (1135-1143) were delivered. This is part of follow-on order of ten (10) units. These newest addition will be fielded in the Camiling-Avenida Line. After a week, another five (5) BV115 (1145-1153) were delivered.

In November 2017, another ten (10) units (1155-1173) were delivered making their total number of BV115 to twenty four (24) units.

After a few days, additional five (5) BV115 were again delivered (1175-1183)

Sometime in April 2018 construction works began in the company's Pulung Bulu motorpool which serves as garage and maintenance facility for units in Angeles route. The said construction is to pave way for a new passenger terminal for its San Fernando, Pampanga-Avenida, Manila via Malolos Route. And units allocated to this route have already been pre-positioned in Angeles.

Fleet
Philippine Rabbit Bus Lines, Inc. currently operates air conditioned buses and utilizes a fleet of Daewoo, Hyundai, Higer and Sunlong buses.
 Daewoo BV115 (Santarosa Motorworks Jetliner bus body) (2016–present)
 Guillin Daewoo GDW6119H2 (2016–present)
 Daewoo BH115E (2010–present)
 Hyundai Aero Space LS (2010, retired)
 Higer KLQ6109 (2015–present)
 Higer KLQ6119E3 280HP (2015–present)
 Higer KLQ6119E3 310HP (2016–present)
 Sunlong SLK6112 (2014–present)
 Sunlong SLK6116 (2014–present)
 Nissan Diesel Euro Trans (Nissan Diesel Philippines Corporation, uses RB46S, RB46SR, and JA430SAN chassis) (1995-2016)
 Nissan Diesel JA450SSN (Santarosa Motorworks Exfoh bus body) (2005-2017)
 Del Monte Motor Works Aero Xtreme (2008–2017)

Destinations

Metro Manila
Avenida, Manila
Araneta Bus Terminal, Cubao, Quezon City

Provincial Destinations
Angeles City via Marquee Mall
City of San Fernando, Pampanga
Mabalacat, Pampanga (Dau Bus Terminal)
Tarlac City, Tarlac via Dau Bus Terminal
Camiling, Tarlac 
Baguio
Alaminos, Pangasinan via Camiling, Tarlac

Former Destinations
Balintawak, Quezon City 
Caloocan 
Concepcion, Tarlac 
Santa Cruz, Zambales (via Alaminos, Pangasinan)
Iba, Zambales 
Bolinao, Pangasinan
Dagupan
San Fernando, La Union
Vigan City, Ilocos Sur
Laoag City, Ilocos Norte 
Aparri, Cagayan
Bangued, Abra 
Balanga, Bataan
Mariveles, Bataan

References

See also
 List of bus companies of the Philippines
 Fariñas Transit Company
 GV Florida Transport
 Partas

Bus companies of the Philippines
Companies established in 1946
1946 establishments in the Philippines